Malta Xlokk, also known as the South Eastern Region, was a region of Malta between 1993 and 2009. It was located on the main island of Malta, bordering Malta Majjistral. It included the capital Valletta. The name referred to the Sirocco wind, which is Xlokk in Maltese.

The region was created by the Local Councils Act of 30 June 1993, and was integrated into the constitution in 2001. It was abolished by Act No. XVI of 2009, and it was divided into the Southern Region and part of the South Eastern Region.

Subdivision

Districts
The region included 2 statistical districts:
South Eastern
Southern Harbour

Local councils
Malta Xlokk included 25 local councils:
 Birgu (Città Vittoriosa)
 Birżebbuġa
 Bormla (Città Cospicua)
 Fgura
 Floriana
 Għaxaq
 Gudja
 Senglea (Città Invicta)
 Kalkara
 Kirkop
 Luqa
 Marsa
 Marsaskala (Wied il-Għajn)
 Marsaxlokk
 Mqabba
 Paola (Raħal Ġdid)
 Qrendi
 Safi
 Santa Luċija
 Tarxien
 Valletta (Città Umilissima)
 Xgħajra
 Żabbar (Città Hompesch)
 Żejtun (Città Beland)
 Żurrieq

References

Former regions of Malta
1993 establishments in Malta
2009 disestablishments in Malta